Jonas Jaknavičius (1589 – April 11, 1668) was a Lithuanian Jesuit chancellery worker, teacher, Rector of the Kražiai College, Smolensk College, and Vilnius College.

Jaknavičius prepared and published a book about the Polish and Lithuanian gospels for sermons which was republished 40 times in the 17th-19th centuries due to their popularity. The Ewangelie polskie y litewskie was written and published in Polish and Lithuanian languages. The oldest surviving version of the Ewangelie polskie y litewskie is from 1647 and was recognized by UNESCO (currently preserved at the Kaunas University of Technology).

Jaknavičius also contributed to the 2nd edition (1631) of Konstantinas Sirvydas' dictionary Dictionarium Trium Lingvarum in usum Studiosæ Iuventutis.

References

Balticists
1580s births
1668 deaths
Lithuanian lexicographers
Linguists from Lithuania
Lithuanian writers
History of the Lithuanian language
16th-century Lithuanian Jesuits
17th-century Lithuanian Jesuits
Academic staff of Vilnius University
Academic staff of Kražiai College